Kiss the Boys Goodbye is a 1941 comedy film directed by Victor Schertzinger and starring Mary Martin, Don Ameche and Oscar Levant. It is based on a play by Clare Boothe Luce which was inspired by the search for an actress to play Scarlett O'Hara in the film version of Gone with the Wind. The score, under the musical direction of Victor Young, includes the title song and "Sand in My Shoes," both by Frank Loesser and Victor Schertzinger.

Plot
Cindy Lou Bethany was raised in the South, but is now a struggling actress and chorus girl in New York City, eager to find a starring role. An audition to portray a Southern belle in a big production is her big chance, but it ends before she gets a chance to show director Lloyd Lloyd what she can do.

The show's financial backer Top Rumson and writer Bert Fisher would like to hire a newcomer, but Lloyd feels more comfortable with his old standby, Myra Stanhope, even though she seems all wrong for this part. The producers travel South to cast the role, so Cindy Lou follows them there, looking up her Aunt Lily Lou and Uncle Jefferson Davis Bethany and scheming to show the New Yorkers what she can do.

Cindy Lou surprises everyone, not only with a musical number showing off her talents, but with a striptease thrown in that ends up with her diving into a swimming pool. Rayburn and others are delighted, but Lloyd is unamused and Gwen quarrels with Cindy Lou, who proceeds to toss her into the pool, too. By the time Lloyd returns to New York, however, he realizes that exactly the actress he is looking for is Cindy Lou, making her a star.

Cast

Original play
Luce completed the play in 1937 for producer Max Gordon. Brock Pemberton was attached as director.

The play opened in 1938.

References

External links
 
 
 1953 radio adaptation of original play at Best Plays from Internet Archive

1941 films
1941 comedy films
American comedy films
American films based on plays
American black-and-white films
Films directed by Victor Schertzinger
1940s English-language films
1940s American films